Zero-X (spelling variants include "Zero X" or "ZeroX") is a fictional Earth spacecraft that first appeared in two of Gerry and Sylvia Anderson's Supermarionation productions, the 1966 film Thunderbirds Are Go and the 1967 television series Captain Scarlet and the Mysterons. Although publicity material for the various Supermarionation series, and the TV Century 21 comic, made references to connections between the Thunderbirds and Captain Scarlet canons, Zero-X is the only official link between the two series.

Fictional history
The first crewed craft to land on Mars, the metallic-blue Zero-X comprises a number of detachable sections. The main body houses the chemical engines which provide the craft with the thrust required for lift-off and the subsequent journey to Mars. The Martian Excursion Vehicle (MEV; later renamed Martian Exploration Vehicle) is attached to the front of the main body where it serves as the spaceship's main control centre during spaceflight. During atmospheric ingress or egress, two remotely controlled "lifting bodies" (self-propelled "flying wing" aerofoils) are attached to the main body at the front and rear of the craft. Finally, a heatproof nose cone with an aluminium exoskeleton protects the MEV during take-off and provides further aerodynamic flow to the vehicle in atmospheric ascent; it is jettisoned just before leaving the Earth's atmosphere, and is the only non-reusable part of the spacecraft.

The lifting bodies act as wings to allow the craft to operate from a runway like a conventional aeroplane, and carry multiple jet engines to reduce the amount of fuel needed for the main body's chemical engines. They separate from the main body when the craft is at a sufficiently high altitude and fly back to base; on re-entry, they rendezvous with the spacecraft and dock with it to again act as wings and provide propulsion in the atmosphere. On reaching Mars, the MEV detaches from the main body, which is left in orbit piloted by a single astronaut, and descends towards the planet's surface. At the surface the MEV extends caterpillar tracks to negotiate the rocky terrain.

The concept of a reusable first-stage lifting body (or in this case, bodies) boosting a smaller spacecraft to high altitude for more efficient use of its propulsion was in direct competition with the vertical-ascent rocket doctrine of the 1960s as a means of achieving spaceflight, and for some time lost out to it, as even the Space Shuttlewhich landed as a conventional aircraftmakes a vertical rocket-powered ascent in the "classical" manner. In more recent years Virgin Galactic have re-established the concept, providing the first private commercial suborbital spaceflights in a similarly launched vehicle. The Zero-X contrasts in this way with Thunderbird 3, which, though nominally more advanced (hinted at because of its secrecy), is still a vertical-ascent rocket.

Zero-X has a total delta velocity of 40 miles per second, a standard acceleration of 1 g, a maximum acceleration of 10 g, and an emergency acceleration of 15 g. It is built by New World Aircraft Corporation, the same company that builds Skyship One.

Appearances

Thunderbirds Are Go
The first crewed mission to Mars ended in failure after the Zero-X spacecraft was accidentally sabotaged by the Hood, who had stowed aboard the craft to photograph its wing mechanisms. The crew managed to escape and two years later a second Zero-X craft successfully reached Mars. However, soon after touching down on the surface, the MEV fired upon a Martian "rock snake" in the belief that it was a lifeless rock formation, provoking retaliation by fire-shooting rock snakes, resulting in the first open combat between humans and extraterrestrials. While the astronauts managed to escape, the lifting body control systems on board the MEV sustained damage during the confrontation, causing the Zero-X to crash upon its return to Earth, landing in Craigsville, United States (roughly 20 miles from its launch site, the fictitious Glenn Field Spaceport). The crew survived, having been saved at the last moment by International Rescue.

In both missions, the Zero-X carried a crew of three with two scientists:

 Paul Travers (captain of the mission) - Travers was modelled on Sean Connery, who was starring as James Bond at the time Thunderbirds Are Go was made.
 Greg Martin (space captain)
 Brad Newman (navigator)
 Dr Tony Grant (astrophysicist)
 Dr Ray Pierce (astronomer)

Captain Scarlet
Re-commissioned by the Spectrum Organisation, the Zero-X returned to Mars in 2068 in search of the source of alien signals detected from Earth.(But only the MEV comes into the picture, not the entire Zero-X)   The crew's hostile actions led to a "war of nerves" with the Mysterons in Captain Scarlet and the Mysterons. After tracing the signals to an alien city complex, the mission commander, Spectrum officer Captain Black, gave the order to fire upon the facility after mistaking imaging devices for weapons and fearing they were about to be attacked. Following the destruction, the three-man crew of the MEV witnessed the miraculous re-materialisation ("retro-metabolism", as it is termed in the TV series) of the Mysteron city, and for their act of aggression the Mysterons took control of Black's mind and body as the principal agent of their vengeance. It is never specified whether Black and the crew actually died on Mars. However, when the Zero-X returned to Earth, Black was its only occupant.(but you can't see that in the episode)  He vanished upon landing at Glenn Field, and shortly after the Mysterons issued their first threat against Earth.

Although the Zero-X does not appear in Gerry Anderson's New Captain Scarlet (2005), a reference is made to it through the depiction of lifting bodies being used to assist spaceships in entering Earth orbit.

Thunderbirds Are Go (TV series)
The Zero-X appears in an episode of the remake series Thunderbirds Are Go: "Signals, Part 1". During its launch, the Zero-X is stolen by the Hood for its light-speed engines, however soon after the engines begin to overload and threaten to create an Extinction-Level Event, Jeff Tracy boards the Zero-X and attempts to take control whilst the Hood ejects in the only escape capsule, Jeff Tracy attempts to take the Zero-X into space, shortly thereafter there is a massive explosion and the ship is presumed destroyed and Jeff Tracy killed. Eight years later, an SOS is picked up from the Oort Cloud apparently from Jeff Tracy and International Rescue attempts to recover the Zero-X escape capsule believing it to be the key to understanding how he survived and his current situation. After analyzing footage from the escape capsule, they determine that the witnessed explosion was actually an aftershock of the Zero-Xs main engine firing at full power and that the Zero-X itself launched into space and subsequently the Oort Cloud at near light speed. The remains of the Zero-X were later discovered partially embedded in a small minor planet in "The Long Reach, Part 1" where Jeff Tracy cannibalized what he could to create a make-shift shelter inside the control deck and was able to survive for eight years until he was rescued by his sons in a new Zero-X called the Zero-XL.

Tie-in media
A series featuring the adventures of the crew of the Zero-X appeared in the comic TV Century 21 and its successors, including Countdown. The strip was written by Angus Allan and illustrated by Mike Noble; running in TV Century 21 (later renamed TV21) from 21 Jan. 1967 to 21 Sept. 1968. A model of the Zero-X was included in the "Project SWORD" line of toys marketed by Century 21 Merchandising.

Filming models
Zero-X was designed by Derek Meddings, whose original drawing named the craft "ZX 26". AP Films commissioned Slough-based company Mastermodels to make two scale filming models. The puppet set design of the cockpit was inspired by the interiors of Concorde, a prototype of which the crew viewed at Filton Airfield.

In 2012, the original MEV filming model, minus the cockpit canopy, was acquired by prop restoration company The Prop Gallery, which commissioned the still-trading Mastermodels to refurbish the miniature that it had built 46 years earlier.

Critical response
According to spaceflight historian Jack Hagerty, the way in which the MEV is deployed from the mothership was inspired by both the titular spacecraft of the Andersons' earlier puppet series Fireball XL5 (whose cockpit section breaks off to form a lander, Fireball Junior) and the modular construction of the real-life Apollo spacecraft. He also states that the name "MEV" is based on "LEM" (Lunar Excursion Module), the original designation for the Apollo Lunar Module. Among other observations, Hagerty questions the names given for some of Zero-Xs components in Thunderbirds Are Go, stating that the craft's so-called nose cone "looks nothing like a cone" and that its lifting bodies do not meet the technical definition a lifting body. He also regards the brevity of the Martian landing as a flaw in the film's plot: "After spending, presumably, many years and billions of dollars mounting this expedition to Mars, all they get for their effort is a couple of hours driving around on the surface." However, he calls the destruction of the Zero-X Mark II "one of the most spectacular crash sequences ever filmed".

Stephen La Rivière, in his book Filmed in Supermarionation: A History of the Future, calls Zero-X "the star of Thunderbirds Are Go", praising Meddings' design and acknowledging its commercial nature: "... cynics would suggest that the various detachable segments (wings and nose cone) had less to do with the storyline and more to do with potential toy manufacturing!" Glenn Erickson of the website DVD Talk considers Zero-X "unwieldy" and aesthetically inferior to Skyship One from the sequel Thunderbird 6 (1968).

Alasdair Wilkins of io9 questions the design of Zero-X in that it is "not especially aerodynamic-looking". He also notes the craft's protracted introduction in Thunderbirds Are Go, judging the film's 10-minute opening launch sequence excessively long: "It's pretty much the Alpha and Omega of launch sequences ... a sequence that threatens to make 2001 [: A Space Odyssey] look like non-stop, thrill-a-minute action." He believes that with the attention to detail given to the various stages of the craft's assembly and take-off, these scenes constitute "launch sequence porn", elaborating: "It's a bunch of people effectively saying, 'Action? Characters? Humour? Nah, forget all that. We know what the people really want to see, and it's clearly the model-work.'" Hagerty states that notwithstanding the quality of Meddings' effects in this sequence, "there are limits to audience patience!" Mark Bould considers the sequence an example of the Anderson productions' "technophilic model-work".

References

Captain Scarlet (franchise)
Fictional elements introduced in 1966
Fictional spacecraft
Thunderbirds (TV series)